was a Japanese samurai of the Heian period. The grandson of Minamoto no Yoshimitsu, Masayoshi was a resident of Hitachi Province. He was killed in battle by Minamoto no Yoshikuni around 1147. Masayoshi was the founder of the Satake clan.

References
"Ashikaga-shi (Kamakura kubō)" on Harimaya.com (Retrieved 20 August 2008)

Satake clan
Samurai
1081 births
1147 deaths
Japanese warriors killed in battle